Frances Allen (1932–2020) was an American computer scientist.

Frances Allen may also refer to:
Frances J. Allen, Canadian general
Frances Margaret Allen or Fanny Allen (1784–1819), Roman Catholic nun
Frances Stebbins Allen (1854–1941), American photographer
Frances Elizabeth Allan or Betty Allan (1905–1952), Australian statistician
Frances Daisy Emery Allen (1876–1958), pioneering physician in Fort Worth, Texas

See also
Francis Allen (disambiguation)